The Kuala Kangsar (Perak Malay: Kole Kangso) is the royal town of Perak, Malaysia. It is the main town in the administrative district of Kuala Kangsar, about 235 km from Kuala Lumpur, Malaysia. The town is administered by the Kuala Kangsar Municipal Council, formerly known as Kuala Kangsar District Council from 1 January 1980 until 17 February 2004.

History
The site must have had a strange effect on Sultan Yusuf Sharifuddin Mudzaffar Shah of Perak who ruled from 1877 to 1887. Unlike many rulers who protected their royal palaces and strongholds by selecting their vantage points carefully where they could detect enemy approach from afar, the Sultan had his first royal palace built beside the riverbank. He then named it 'Istana Sri Sayong'.

Apart from being exposed to the impending threat of invasion, the other problem was the force of monsoon seasons, which led to numerous flooding as water gushed down from the jungles above through the many tributaries. The name Kuala Kangsar is believed to be derived from 'Kuala Kurang-Sa', which literally means '100 minus (-) one', usually interpreted as 'the 99th small tributary to flow into the Perak River'.

One flooding was so severe, it almost swept the palace away. Finally, after the Big Flood or Air Bah in 1926, it was decided to move the place further up onto the knoll where stands the current Royal Palace named Istana Iskandariah with its Art-Deco architecture, a rare but significant piece of architectural milestone in Malaysia.

The Sultan of Perak officially resides in Kuala Kangsar, and it has been Perak's royal seat since the 18th century. It is one of four towns that plays a role in Perak's complex succession system. It was the administrative seat of the first British Resident in the Malay Peninsula, James W. W. Birch, from October 1874 until he was murdered on 2 November 1875. It was the capital of Perak until 1876.

Kuala Kangsar is also known in Malaysian history as the site where the first Conference of Rulers of the Federated Malay States, the Durbar, was held in 1897. By the 1890s, the growth of the tin mining towns of Ipoh and Taiping had eclipsed Kuala Kangsar, but it remains to this day one of the most attractive of the Malay royal capitals.

The town is also the site of the first rubber tree planted in Malaysia. The person responsible was the English botanist Henry Nicholas Ridley. He was the one who helped Malaya and eventually Malaysia become the largest rubber producer in the world. The tree still stands today.

The first Malaysian scout troop was established in Kuala Kangsar. Consequently, its squad number is 001.

Education

 SMJK Tsung Wah
 Raja Perempuan Kelsom Secondary School (SMK RPK)
 Madrasah Idrisiah Kuala Kangsar (MADID)
 Malay College Kuala Kangsar (MCKK)
 Clifford Secondary School (Sekolah Menengah Clifford)
 Sultan Azlan Shah University (USAS)
 Kolej Vokasional Kuala Kangsar (KVKK)
 Maktab Rendah Sains Mara Sultan Azlan Shah (MRSM SAS)
 Kolej RISDA PERAK Kuala Kangsar
 Kolej Komuniti Chenderoh
 Kolej Komuniti Kuala Kangsar
 Kem PLKN Desa Rimba
 Kem PLKN Kota Lama

Tourist and historical attractions

 Ubudiah Mosque and the Royal Mausoleum
 Ihsaniah Iskandariah Mosque
 Istana Kenangan (Old Palace, now the Perak Royal Museum)
 Pavilion Tower
 Istana Iskandariah (The Royal Palace)
 Kuala Kangsar Clock Tower
 Malaya's first rubber tree
 Sultan Azlan Shah Gallery
 Victoria Bridge (built 1900)
 Iskandariah Bridge
 Sultan Abdul Jalil Shah Bridge

Transportation
Two bridges now connect Kuala Kangsar to Sayong. Sultan Abdul Jalil Shah Bridge is made out of concrete and located near the town while Sultan Iskandar Bridge is farther upstream and is made out of steel. Kuala Kangsar is easily accessible via the North–South Expressway and by train.

Public Transport
Bus
Perak Transit (shuttle K. Kangsar-Ipoh & K. Kangsar-Lenggong)
Sri Maju Express
Transnasional Express
Starmart Express
Ekspres Perdana
Konsortium Ekspres Mutiara
Konsortium Bas Express
Kumpulan Bas Perak
Maju Express
Grassland
Five Star
ALISAN
Red Omnibus (shuttle to K. Kangsar-Taiping)
Wai Thong Omnibus (Shuttle to K. Kangsar-Manong)
Trains
Inter-city rail:   Kuala Kangsar railway station

Notable people

Rafidah Aziz, Malaysian politician

References

External links

 

Kuala Kangsar District
Towns in Perak